Terrence Allman Sullivan (born 7 September 1935) is a former middle-distance runner. He competed in the men's 1500 metres and 800 metres at the 1960 Summer Olympics, representing Rhodesia. He finished third in the 1962 British Empire and Commonwealth Games 1 mile competing for Rhodesia and Nyasaland. He also participated in the 880 yards in 1962, but was eliminated in the semi-finals. At the 1958 British Empire and Commonwealth Games, representing Southern Rhodesia, he finished fourth in the 880 yards and was eliminated in the heats of the 1 mile.

References

1935 births
Living people
Athletes (track and field) at the 1960 Summer Olympics
Rhodesian athletes
Olympic athletes of Rhodesia
Sportspeople from Johannesburg
Athletes (track and field) at the 1958 British Empire and Commonwealth Games
Athletes (track and field) at the 1962 British Empire and Commonwealth Games
Commonwealth Games competitors for Southern Rhodesia
Commonwealth Games bronze medallists for Rhodesia and Nyasaland
Commonwealth Games medallists in athletics
South African emigrants to Rhodesia
White Rhodesian people
Medallists at the 1962 British Empire and Commonwealth Games